For a While may refer to:

 "For a While" (song), a song by Stellar
 For a While (album), an album by Dolly Varden